The 1994 Winmau World Masters was held on 3rd December 1994. Richie Burnett won the tournament by beating Steve Beaton in the final.

Men's tournament

Top 16 seeds
  Steve Beaton 
  Richie Burnett 
  John Part 
  Martin Adams 
  Mike Gregory 
  Andy Fordham 
  Dave Askew 
  Colin Monk
  Roland Scholten 
  Raymond van Barneveld 
  Kevin Painter 
  Per Skau 
  Alan Brown
  Bob Taylor 
  Andy Jenkins 
  Les Wallace

Draw

Boy's tournament

Preliminary round
  Andrew Pollard 1–3  Barry Russell
  Robert Pascall 3–0  Ilkka Kovanen
  Vincent Barrett 3–2  Kurt Bradac
  Paul Littlejohns 0–3  Brian Sorensen
  Chris Grelat 1–3  Karsten Wieggrebe
  Cindy Jonckheere 0–3  Nick Buckingham
  Peter Mainhardt 3–2  Gordon Stanmore
  Simon Colomban 3–0  Paul McShannock
  Minna Niemineu 0–3  Alan Sutch
  Steven de Brucker 3–2  Joel Olweny
  Martin Whatmough 3–1  Dafne Barbalho
  Alan Soutar 3–0  Ivars Skesters

Last 32
  Ondres Veselovsky bye  Stefan Stoev
  Evija Sulce 0–3  'Barry Russell
  Robert Pascall 3–2  Vincent Barrett
  Jorge Henrique 3–1  Harriet Wakooli
  Daniel Harrington 0–3  Arjan Moen
  Rafael Carmona 2–3  Brian Sorensen
  Karsten Wieggrebe 0–3  Nick Buckingham
  Peter Kelloway 3–0  Bill-Tore Ingles
  Nigel Russell 3–0  Samuel Szunyog
  Lucie Tomancova 2–3  Peter Mainhardt
  Simon Colomban 0–3  Alan Sutch
  Matt Chapman 3-2  Mieke de Boer
  Emilie Levillain 0–3  David Pearce
  Martin Harris 1–3  Steven de Brucker
  Martin Whatmough 2–3  Alan Soutar
  Crystal Keer 0–3  Lee Palfreyman''

 Last 16 
  Lee Palfreyman 3–0  Ondres Veselovsky
  Barry Russell 0–3  Robert Pascall  Jorge Henrique 1–3  Arjan Moen  Brian Sorensen 0–3  Nick Buckingham  Peter Kelloway 3–1  Nigel Russell
  Peter Mainhardt 3–1  Alan Sutch
  Matt Chapman 3–1  David Pearce
  Steven de Brucker 3–1  Alan Soutar

 Quarter-finals 
  Lee Palfreyman 3–1  Robert Pascall
  Arjan Moen 3–2  Nick Buckingham
  Peter Kelloway 3–0  Peter Mainhardt
  Matt Chapman 1–3  Steven de Brucker Semi-finals 
  Lee Palfreyman 3–2  Arjan Moen
  Peter Kelloway 1–3  Steven de Brucker Final 
best of 5 legs
  Lee Palfreyman 0–3  Steven de Brucker'''

References

World Masters (darts)
1994 in English sport
1994 in darts